Gustavo Martínez Zuviría (28 December 1915 – 27 April 1991) was de facto Federal Interventor of Córdoba, Argentina from June 28, 1966 to July 27, 1966.

References

1915 births
1991 deaths
Governors of Córdoba Province, Argentina